During the Second World War, the basic tactical formation used by the majority of combatants was the division. It was a self-contained formation that possessed all the required forces for combat, which was supplemented by its own artillery, engineers, communications and supply units. On 3 September 1939, at the start of the war, the United Kingdom had 2 armoured, 24 infantry and 7 anti-aircraft divisions. The anti-aircraft divisions were not comparable in role to formations that were intended for combat such as infantry divisions. In September, the British Army stated that 55 divisions (a mix of armoured, infantry and cavalry) would be raised to combat Germany. The United Kingdom would provide 32 of these formations and the remainder would be raised by the Dominions and India.

In 1941, this goal was adjusted to 57 divisions, with the United Kingdom to provide 36. By the end of 1941, the United Kingdom had met its quota. During the war, 85 divisional formations were raised but did not all exist simultaneously and not all of them were combat formations. For example, the 12th Division (SDF) was raised to protect the lines of communication behind fighting formations. Several divisions were created when a division of one type was converted into another, for example the 42nd (East Lancashire) Infantry Division was converted into the 42nd Armoured Division. Others, such as the 79th Armoured Division, were not intended to act as a fighting formation. Instead, it acted in an administrative capacity for dispersed units that were engaged in combat. The 85 divisional formations included 2 airborne, 12 anti-aircraft, 11 armoured, 1 cavalry, 10 coastal defence (known as County Divisions) and 49 infantry divisions. At the end of the war, in 1945, the British Army had 24 divisions.

Background

During the interwar period, the British Army was split into two branches: the regular army, which numbered 224,000 men with a reserve of 173,700 at the start of the war, and the part-time Territorial Army that numbered 438,100 with a reserve of around 20,750 men. The main goal of the regular army, largely built around battalion-sized formations, was to police and garrison the British Empire. The basic tactical formation among the major militaries was the division. These were self-contained formations that possessed all the required forces needed for combat. This included its own artillery, engineers, communications, and supply units. The provision of a multi-division expeditionary force, for a war on the continent against a European adversary, was not considered for much of the interwar period by the British government which deemed it unlikely for such a war to occur.

In 1939, the regular army consisted of seven infantry and two armoured divisions. Two of the infantry divisions had been formed for the repression of the 1936–1939 Arab revolt in Palestine. The Territorial Army was intended to be the primary method of expanding the number of divisions available to the army. During the interwar period, the British government reduced the funding and size of the Territorial Army. By 1936, they had concluded that it could not be modernised or equipped for a European war over the following three-year period and therefore delayed further funding. At the beginning of 1939, the Territorial Army had twelve infantry divisions. Following the German occupation of the remnants of the Czechoslovak state in March 1939, the Territorial Army was ordered to double in size to 24 divisions. By the outbreak of the Second World War, in September 1939, some of these divisions had formed while others were being created.

On 8 September 1939, the British Army announced that it would raise 55 divisions to be deployed to France, as part of the British Expeditionary Force (BEF), for service against Germany. Thirty-two of these formations were to come from the British Army, and rest from the armies of the British Dominions (for example, the Canadian Army) and the British Indian Army. The goal was to fully equip and deploy 20 divisions within the first year of the war and all 55 divisions within two years. The British contingent was to come from the expanded Territorial Army and the regular army divisions based in the UK. By May 1940, the BEF contained only 13 divisions. During the latter stages of the campaign, the Beauman Division was raised  from rear-area personnel. As a result of defeat in the Battle of France and the return of the BEF following the Dunkirk evacuation, the original deployment of divisions was not realised. The 51st (Highland) Infantry Division was lost during the Battle of France and it was later reformed by renaming the 9th (Highland) Infantry Division. After the BEF returned to the UK, four infantry divisions were disbanded to reinforce other formations. The British Army also increased the recruitment for their regiments in Africa (the Nigeria Regiment, the Gold Coast Regiment, and the King's African Rifles), which resulted in two divisions being formed in Africa in mid-1940.

The goal of 55 divisions was increased to 58 in January 1941, then cut to 57 on 6 March; the UK was to provide 36 of these. During 1941, the 2nd Armoured Division in North Africa was overrun, and its headquarters captured. By the end of the year, the British Army had 37 active divisions (one airborne, nine armoured and 27 infantry). On 15 February 1942, the 18th Infantry Division was captured by Japanese forces following the Battle of Singapore. Lack of equipment hindered growth and an increasing number of divisions based in the UK were reduced in size to provide men for formations fighting abroad. By 1943, it became necessary for front line divisions to be cannibalised to provide reinforcements for other formations. During 1943, three new divisions were formed after the further expansion of the African regiments. By 1944, the UK still had 35 divisions, of which 18 were for training or to be used as a pool for reinforcements. By mid-1944, the army did not have enough men to replace the losses suffered by front line infantry units. Transfers of men from the Royal Artillery and the Royal Air Force to be retrained as infantry took place, and more formations were disbanded to provide the required reinforcements. By the end of 1944, the army had shrunk to 26 divisions: 5 armoured and 21 infantry (including airborne). In the final year of the war, the number decreased to 24 divisions.

Airborne 

Impressed by the German airborne force during the 1940 Battle of France, the British Prime Minister, Winston Churchill, ordered the creation of a paratrooper force of 5,000 men. The qualified success of Operation Colossus, a small scale commando raid, prompted further expansion of this force, and resulted in an additional requirement for a glider force of 10,000 men to be created. The recruitment for the size of this force took until 1943, by which time two divisions had been formed. The airborne division was to comprise three brigades: two parachute brigades, each with three battalions from the Parachute Regiment, and an "airlanding" brigade of three infantry battalions carried into battle by gliders.The first parachute battalions were formed from volunteers from across the British military. As the airborne force grew, infantry battalions were selected to be converted into parachute battalions. The men were invited to volunteer for parachute service, or assigned to a new unit. The new battalions were then brought up to strength from volunteers from other units. The airlanding battalions came from existing infantry units that were converted to glider infantry, and the soldiers did not have the ability to opt-out.

The war establishment, the on-paper strength, was set at 12,148 men, with a large number of automatic weapons assigned to the division. The establishment called for 7,171 bolt-action Lee Enfield rifles, 6,504 Sten submachine guns, 966 Bren light machine guns, and 46 Vickers medium machine guns. Each division was also expected to have 392 PIAT anti-tank weapons, 525 mortars, 100 anti-tank guns, and twenty-seven  M116 pack howitzers. Just over 6,000 vehicles—primarily jeeps, motorcycles, and bicycles, but also including 22 Tetrarch light tanks—were authorised for each division. Gliders delivered the heavier equipment.

Anti-aircraft 

Between 1935 and the start of the war, the British Army formed anti-aircraft divisions. These formations were part of the Territorial Army, and were not intended to be comparable to other formations such as infantry divisions. The anti-aircraft divisions were assigned to a particular area, which could cover hundreds or thousands of square miles. They varied dramatically in manpower, the number of brigades controlled, and the number of weapons assigned. For example, the 1st Anti-Aircraft Division was assigned to defend London, while the 3rd Anti-Aircraft Division was assigned to defend both Scotland and Northern Ireland. In September 1939, Anti-Aircraft Command's seven divisions had a combined total of 695 heavy anti-aircraft guns compared to an intended 2,232, and 253 light anti-aircraft guns out of an establishment of 1,200. The divisions also had access to 2,700 searchlights, out of a recommended total of 4,700. By 1941, the divisions had 1,691 heavy guns, 940 light guns, and 4,532 searchlights. At the start of the war, the divisions and their command structure had a total of 106,690 men; manpower increased to 157,319 by July 1940, and was over 300,000 by mid-1941. All of the divisions were disbanded in October 1942 as part of a reorganisation of the anti-aircraft command structure. The divisions were replaced by seven groups, which were intended to reduce the overall number of formations, save manpower, and be more flexible.

Armoured 

Between May 1939 and the end of the Second World War, the armoured division went through nine organisational changes. In 1939, it was intended that an armoured division would have 110 light tanks, 217 cruiser tanks, and 24 cruiser tanks equipped with howitzers for close support, as well as 2,500 other vehicles, 9,442 men, and 16 field guns. In 1940, the establishment was changed to two light tanks, 304 cruisers, and 36 close support tanks, with 2,600 vehicles, and 10,750 men. The early armoured formations did not reach these proposed tank strengths. For example, the 1st Armoured Division landed in France, in 1940, with 114 light tanks and 143 cruisers. The 2nd Armoured Division, prior to being deployed to the Middle East in late 1940, peaked at a strength of 256 light tanks and 54 cruisers. By 1942, a division was to consist of 13,235 men with 230 tanks, of which 183 would be cruisers and the rest would be for support, along with around 3,000 other vehicles and 48 field guns. For the final two years of the war, the establishment was set at 14,964 men, 246 medium tanks, 63 light tanks, 27 tanks Crusader self-propelled anti-aircraft guns, 27 tanks that were outfitted as artillery observation posts, 24 field guns, 24 self-propelled field guns, 54 anti-tank guns, and 24 self-propelled anti-tank guns. In July 1944, for example, the Guards, the 7th, and the 11th Armoured Divisions all averaged 250 medium tanks. The Guards had 15,600 men, the 7th had 15,100, and the 11th had 14,400.

The early organisation of the armoured divisions included two armoured brigades (with six armoured regiments) and one support group of two infantry battalions, combat engineers and artillery. The intent of the division was to exploit gaps in the opposing frontline created by the infantry divisions. The armoured divisions were considered 'tank-heavy', due to the lack of infantry support to guard the tanks. It took repeated setbacks during the Western Desert campaign before a major reorganisation took place. By 1942, the division had evolved to be based around one armoured brigade containing three armoured regiments and one motorised infantry battalion, the support group was replaced by a three-battalion infantry brigade, and additional support weapons were allocated as divisional assets. However, doctrine still dictated for the artillery, infantry, and tanks to fight separate battles. The artillery would engage opposing anti-tank guns; the infantry would secure captured ground or provide flank protection in confined terrain; and the tanks would move ahead to destroy enemy tanks and disrupt the opposing lines of communication. The division, rather than exploiting gaps, would find itself increasingly being used a battering ram to break through the enemy frontline. The armoured divisions diverged in how they were organised between those that were deployed to Northwest Europe in June 1944, and those operating in Italy. In Italy, the division's reconnaissance regiments were equipped with armoured cars, whereas the reconnaissance regiments of those assigned to fight in Northwest Europe were primarily equipped with Cromwell tanks. In Italy, starting in June 1944, the infantry component was increased with a second infantry brigade that was either integrated or attached on an as needed basis. The divisions assigned to Northwest Europe did not have this increased infantry, and it took further setbacks before military planners decided that the tanks and infantry needed to work more closely together. Starting in July 1944, an armoured regiment (including the reconnaissance regiment) was paired with one of the division's infantry battalions (three from the infantry brigade, and one motorised infantry battalion assigned to the armoured brigade) to implement this change, although on paper they maintained the existing separate brigade structure.

Cavalry 

Prior to the outbreak of the war, the British military promised their French counterparts that the BEF would contain at least one cavalry division that would be dispatched within six months of the outbreak of the war. The division would be formed following the start of hostilities, by Territorial Army regiments that would coalesce. The war establishment was set at 11,097 men, 6,081 horses, and 1,815 vehicles distributed between three brigades, each containing three cavalry regiments. The division was primarily equipped with rifles, and supported by 203 light machine guns, 36 medium machine guns, and 48 field guns. For anti-tank protection, the establishment called for 247 anti-tank rifles. As the only division type to include horses, it was required to have three mobile sections from the Royal Army Veterinary Corps. Doctrine called for the division to be mounted infantry: moving from place to place on horseback, and then dismounting to engage opposing forces.

County 

In 1940, following the Battle of France, the UK prepared for a potential Axis invasion. As the year progressed, the size of the Army increased quickly. Newly formed infantry battalions were grouped together to create the county divisions. These formations were around 10,000 men strong, and were assigned to defend the coastlines of threatened sectors of the country and man coastal artillery. These divisions were largely immobile and lacked divisional assets such as artillery, engineers, and reconnaissance forces. This allowed infantry divisions to be freed up from such duties and to form a reserve further inland for counterattacking enemy forces.

These formations maintained their coastal defence role, even after the German invasion of the Soviet Union in June 1941; British military planners acknowledged that if the Soviet Union collapsed, Germany could easily transfer substantial forces west. This perceived threat subsided in late 1941, with the arrival of autumn and winter weather and coupled with the production of new equipment for the British Army. The latter allowed the War Office to take steps to better balance the army, with the creation of additional armour and special forces units. Consequently, the county divisions were disbanded or redesignated.

Infantry 

The infantry were the backbone of the British Army, and were intended to be mobile and with sufficient integrated artillery to be able to overcome opposing forces. At the start of the war, the infantry were separated into two classes: infantry divisions and motor divisions. Each infantry division had three infantry brigades and three artillery regiments. In 1939, these divisions had an establishment of 13,863 men, 72 field guns, and 2,993 vehicles. The motor division had two motorised infantry brigades and two artillery regiments, with an establishment of 10,136 men, 48 field guns, and 2,326 vehicles. The intended offensive use of the infantry division was to penetrate the enemy's defensive line, with the support of infantry tanks from independent tank brigades. Any gap created would then be exploited by armoured divisions, and the subsequent captured territory would be secured by the faster and more mobile motor divisions. The motor division, while being able to transport all of its infantry, was weaker than the infantry division as a result of the decreased amount of manpower and firepower. After the Battle of France, the British Army implemented lessons learnt from the campaign in France, which included the decision to base the standard division around three brigades, and the abandonment of the motor division concept. This change saw four infantry divisions disbanded to reassign troops to the former motor divisions.

The Army was split into two branches: the full-time professional force of regulars, and the part-time Territorial Army. Both branches maintained divisions. By 1939, the Territorial Army's intended role was to be the sole method of expanding the size of the army (in contrast to the creation of Kitchener's Army during the First World War). All members of the Territorial Army were required to take the general service obligation: if the British Government decided, territorial soldiers could be deployed overseas for combat. This avoided the complications of the First World War-era Territorial Force, whose members were initially not required to leave Britain unless they volunteered for overseas service. The pre-war Territorial Army divisions were referred to as 'the first-line'. Prior to the outbreak of the Second World War, the first-line formations were ordered to create new formations in a process called 'duplicating'; the new formations were called 'the second-line'. Planners intended the first-line formations to recruit over their establishments (aided by an increase in pay, the removal of restrictions on promotion which had hindered prior recruiting, construction of better-quality barracks, and an increase in supper rations) and then form second-line formations from cadres around which the divisions could be expanded.

In 1941, the divisions were divided between being listed as higher establishment formations, and lower establishment ones. The former were intended for deployment overseas and combat, whereas the latter were restricted to home defence in a static role, and were reduced in size. In 1941, a division was intended to have 17,298 men, who were equipped primarily with rifles. They were to be supplemented by 451 sub-machine guns, 768 light machine guns, 48 medium machine guns, 218 mortars, 72 field guns, 48 anti-tank guns, 48 anti-aircraft guns, and 4,166 vehicles. In 1944, the establishment was increased 18,347 men, 6,525 sub-machine guns, 1,162 light machine guns, 359 mortars, 436 PIAT anti-tank weapons, 72 field guns, 110 anti-tank guns, and 4,330 vehicles. Out of the overall total of men within the division, around 7,000 were frontline infantry and the rest allocated to the various divisional supporting arms and services. The overall strength of a division could vary considerably. For example, during the Siege of Tobruk in 1941, the 70th Infantry Division was 28,000 men strong; in June 1944, the total combined strength of the remaining five lower establishment divisions was 17,845 men; and in July 1944, the higher establishment 15th (Scottish) Infantry Division was 16,970 men strong.

In 1942, the British Army experimented with the format of their infantry formations. Several were converted into "mixed divisions" via the removal of one infantry brigades, and a brigade of tanks being assigned in their place. The concept was deemed not successful, and abandoned the following year. During 1943, the War Office intended to provide eight tank brigades (equipped with infantry tanks) to the army. These would be a corps-level asset that could then be attached to infantry divisions as needed. Due to the lack of infantry tank production, only three such brigades were available. However, several independent armoured brigades (equipped with the M4 Sherman medium tank) were formed. The independent armoured brigades were utilised in the same manner as the tank brigades. In Northwest Europe, infantry divisions had access to specialised tanks from the 79th Armoured Division. These tank formations would be attached to the infantry division as needed.

See also 
 British deception formations in World War II
 Divisional insignia of the British Army
 List of British divisions in World War I
 List of British brigades of the Second World War
 Military history of Britain during World War II

Notes

Footnotes

Citations

References

Further reading

External links
  Various contemporary training materials regarding British tank forces, including divisions

British divisions

World War II
British, World War II
Divisions
Divisions